Albert Anae (born 21 June 1989) is a rugby union footballer who plays professionally for the Mitsubishi Sagamihara DynaBoars in the Japanese Top League. He usually plays as a prop or hooker. Anae previously played for the Queensland Reds, and Italian club Benetton.

Early life 
Of Samoan heritage, Anae was born in Wellington, New Zealand, where he was introduced to rugby at the Upper Hutt Rugby Football Club by his father Sio. He moved to Brisbane with his family at a young age.

Anae attended Ipswich Grammar School and was selected to represent Queensland at the Australian Schools Rugby Championships as a prop in 2006. He went on to play for Australian Schools, U19s and U20s.

Anae was selected to join the Queensland Reds Development tour of Ireland and France at the end of 2007. He made his Australian under-20 debut in 2008 at the inaugural IRB Junior World Championship in Wales.

Rugby career 
Anae played his first Super Rugby match for the Reds against the Hurricanes in Wellington in 2011, the year that the Reds won the Super Rugby Championship. Later that season he played for Sunnybank in the Queensland Premier Rugby competition, defeating Brothers in the grand final.

In 2012, Anae was selected in the Reds Extended Player Squad (EPS), and developed his skills to be capable of playing all three front-row positions. Following injuries to Saia Faingaa and James Hanson, he was selected at hooker against the Western Force at Suncorp Stadium in round two. The Reds won the game 35–20 with Anae excelling when given the opportunity. He finished the season with five caps.

In 2013, after signing a full-time contract, Anae earned a further eleven caps with the Reds. He travelled to New Zealand in August of that year to play for Bay of Plenty in the ITM Cup when he was called up to the Wallabies squad to replace the injured Tatafu Polota-Nau.

Albert played the final game of his Qld Reds career at the conclusion of the 2014 Super 15 regular season. He did not make any appearances for the Brumbies and was released during the 2016 Super Rugby season to join Japanese team Mitsubishi Sagamihara DynaBoars.

Reference list

Super Rugby statistics

External links 

 Reds profile
 itsrugby.co.uk

1989 births
Australian rugby union players
New Zealand sportspeople of Samoan descent
Queensland Reds players
Bay of Plenty rugby union players
Rugby union props
Rugby union hookers
Rugby union players from Wellington City
New Zealand emigrants to Australia
Living people
Benetton Rugby players
Expatriate rugby union players in Italy
Canberra Vikings players
Mitsubishi Sagamihara DynaBoars players
Expatriate rugby union players in Japan
Melbourne Rebels players
Auckland rugby union players
Shimizu Koto Blue Sharks players